The placid greenbul (Phyllastrephus placidus) is a species of songbird in the bulbul family, Pycnonotidae. It is found in eastern Africa from eastern Kenya through Tanzania to north-eastern Zambia, Malawi and north-western Mozambique. In the Taita Hills (southeast Kenya), habitat features associated with nest‐site selection vary among forest fragments that are exposed to different levels of habitat disturbance.

Taxonomy and systematics 
The placid greenbul was originally described in the genus Xenocichla (a synonym for Bleda). Some authorities consider the placid greenbul to be either a subspecies of Cabanis's greenbul or Fischer's greenbul. Alternate names for the placid greenbul include the Kenya Highlands greenbul, Kenya Highlands olive bulbul, Kenya Highlands olive greenbul, olive mountain greenbul, and Shelley's greenbul. The latter name should not be confused with the species of the same name, Arizelocichla masukuensis.

References 

Phyllastrephus
Greenbuls
Birds of East Africa
Birds described in 1899